Regular academic conferences in medieval studies include:

 International Congress on Medieval Studies, annual conference (Kalamazoo MI, U.S.)
 International Medieval Congress, annual conference (Leeds, UK)
 Medieval Academy of America, annual conference (various locations in the US and Canada)
 International Arthurian Society, International Arthurian Congress every three years, national branches hold branch meetings in the interim years (various locations)
 Canadian Society of Medievalists, annual conference (various locations in Canada)
 UBC Medieval Workshop, annual conference (Vancouver, Canada)
 Medieval Chronicle Society, triennial conference (various locations)
 International Congress for Medieval Latin Studies, quinquennial conference (various locations)
 International Medieval Society, annual symposium (Paris, France)
 The Medieval Translator, biennial conference (various locations)
 Association internationale pour l’étude du moyen français, biennial conference (various locations)
 Société internationale pour l'étude du théâtre médiéval, triennial conference (various locations)
 The Texas Medieval Association, annual conference (various locations in Texas)
 Vagantes Conference on Medieval Studies, annual conference (various locations in North America)
 International Reynard Society, biennial conference (various locations)
 New College Conference on Medieval & Renaissance Studies, biennial conference (Sarasota, Florida)
 New England Graduate Medieval Conference, annual conference (cycles between Brown University, University of Connecticut, and Yale University)
 North Texas Medieval Graduate Student Symposium, annual conference, University of North Texas, Denton Texas
 Byzantine Studies Conference, annual conference (various locations)
 International Medieval Meeting, annual conference (Lleida, Spain)
 Medieval Colloquium, annual conference (The University of the South, Sewanee, TN)

Medieval studies